Adolf Martin Pleischl (born 10 October 1787, in Hossenreith, Bohemia; died 31 July 1867, in Dorf an der Enns) was a chemist and medical doctor.

In 1815 he obtained his medical doctorate from the University of Prague, where he later served as a professor of general and pharmaceutical chemistry (1821–38). At Prague he is credited with improvement and redevelopment of the chemical-pharmaceutical institute.  In 1838 he relocated to the University of Vienna, where he also redeveloped and modernized its chemical and pharmaceutical facilities. As an instructor, two of his better-known students were Johann Florian Heller (1813-1871) and Johann August Natterer (1821-1900).

While at Prague he performed the first scientific analysis of its water (the Moldau River, city fountains, drinking water). He also analyzed the thermal springs of Bohemian spa sites, and was an enthusiastic recruiter for spa treatment at Karlsbad, Marienbad, Franzensbad and Teplitz. His endorsement of Karlsbad water helped lead to a lucrative source of income through the export of bottled water and soda products.

Pleischl is credited with the creation of a safe non-metallic enamel for coating metal dishes. Also, he attempted to liquefy carbon dioxide by means of pressure and low temperature, a process that was later successfully achieved by his pupil, Johann August Natterer.

In his later years, he was awarded with the Knight's Cross of the Order of Franz Joseph. In 1949 the "Pleischlgasse" in Simmering (11th District- Vienna) was named in his honour. His daughter Mary, was married to physician Johann von Oppolzer (1808-1871).

References 
 "Parts of this article are based on a translation of an equivalent article at the German Wikipedia, namely: Biographisches Lexikon des Kaiserthums Oesterreich.

Austrian chemists
19th-century Austrian physicians
Austrian people of German Bohemian descent
People from Horní Planá
1787 births
1867 deaths